Anders Ingemar Åkesson, (born 28 November 1958) is a Swedish politician and member of the Riksdag for the Center Party since 2006. He is currently taking up seat number 11 for the constituency of Kalmar County.

From 2004 until 2006 he was a spokesperson in the Regional Association of Kalmar County.

As a newly elected member of parliament, he became a member of the Committee on Cultural Affairs in 2006 and an alternate for the Committee on Foreign Affairs. After the 2010 general election he left both committees to join the Committee on Transport and Communications and the War Delegation along with becoming an alternate for the election committee.

On 9 July 2015, Åkesson received attention from mass media after his driver's license had been revoked after multiple incidents of him speeding. After the 2018 general election Åkesson became the vice-Speaker for the Committee on Transport and Communications succeeding Jessica Rosencrantz.

References 

1958 births
Living people
Members of the Riksdag from the Centre Party (Sweden)
Members of the Riksdag 2006–2010
Members of the Riksdag 2010–2014
Members of the Riksdag 2014–2018
Members of the Riksdag 2018–2022
21st-century Swedish politicians